Bolognetta (Sicilian: Bulugnetta) is a comune (municipality) in the Metropolitan City of Palermo in the Italian region Sicily, located about  southeast of Palermo.

In the 17th century Bolognetta was a fief of the Mancini family with the name of Ogliastro.

Bolognetta borders the following municipalities: Baucina, Casteldaccia, Marineo, Misilmeri, Ventimiglia di Sicilia, Villafrati.

References

External links
 Official website

Municipalities of the Metropolitan City of Palermo